Sergei Mikhailovich Smirnov (born October 12, 1950) is a retired Russian intelligence officer whose career ended with a seventeen-year stint as First Deputy Director of the Federal Security Service (FSB). He was made a General of the Army in 2006.

Early life and education 
Born in Chita in 1950, his family moved to Leningrad in 1952. He later attended school alongside Nikolai Patrushev and Boris Gryzlov at the school No. 211. Together with Gryzlov he graduated from M.A. Bonch-Bruevich Leningrad Electroengineering Institute of Communications in 1973. 

He completed the Higher Courses of the KGB under the Council of Ministers of the USSR in Minsk in 1975.

Intelligence career 
In 1975, he joined the KGB and the early part of his career was spent in the Leningrad region KGB and then FSB.

While not a personal friend of Vladimir Putin, he was a member of the Leningrad security clique. When Putin was made director of the FSB in 1998, Patrushev became his deputy and Smirnov moved to Moscow. He quickly acquired one of the key positions within the agency: head of the Internal Security Directorate (UVB), the watchdogs’ watchdog.

In 1999, he became the Chief of the Internal Security Directorate of FSB.

From January 5, 2001, to June 2003, he was the Chief of the Saint Petersburg and Leningrad Oblast FSB Directorate.

In July 2003 he became First Deputy Director of the FSB, retaining his position after a major reorganization of it in July 2004.

On December 20, 2006, he was made a General of the Army by presidential decree.

Personal life 
Smirnov was reported to have had a stroke several years prior to his retirement.

Retirement 
In October 2020, Smirnov retired quietly in an apparent dismissal by Vladimir Putin. It was no surprise that he was going to retire, as he had reached the age of 70 and was already in ill-health, but it was a surprise that he departed office with such a lack of fanfare and no comfortable sinecures. He was, after all, a powerful and influential figure within the Russian security community.

Honors and awards

 Master of Sports of the Soviet Union in handball.
 Order of Military Merit
 Order of Friendship
 Order of Honor

References

External links
Biography by Vladimir Pribylovsky (in Russian)

1950 births
Living people
People from Chita, Zabaykalsky Krai
Russian politicians
KGB officers
Recipients of the Order of Military Merit (Russia)
Recipients of the Order of Honour (Russia)
Generals of the army (Russia)